The discography of Gossip, an American indie rock band, consists of five studio albums, four live albums, two compilation albums, seven extended plays, eleven singles, and ten music videos. The group was founded in 1999 by vocalist Beth Ditto, guitarist Brace Paine and drummer Kathy Mendonca while attending Evergreen State College in Olympia, Washington. The following year they released a self-titled EP on the independent record label K Records. Gossip released their debut studio album, That's Not What I Heard, in January 2001. Their second EP, Arkansas Heat, was issued the next year. Movement, the band's second studio album, and a live album titled Undead in NYC followed in 2003.

In November 2003, Mendonca left the group. She was replaced by Hannah Blilie on the Gossip's third studio album Standing in the Way of Control, released in January 2006. The album reached number 22 in the United Kingdom and was certified gold by the British Phonographic Industry. Three singles, "Standing in the Way of Control", "Listen Up!" and "Jealous Girls", were released from the album: "Standing in the Way of Control" peaked at number seven in the UK and number 25 in Ireland.

Gossip worked extensively with producer Rick Rubin in recording their fourth studio album, Music for Men, which was released in October 2009. The album peaked at number 164 on the US Billboard 200 and reached the top ten in Austria, France and Germany. Four singles were released from the album: "Heavy Cross", "Love Long Distance", "Pop Goes the World" and "Men in Love", with "Heavy Cross" charting at number two in Germany and Switzerland.

Their fifth studio album, A Joyful Noise, was released in May 2012 and featured collaborations with British production team Xenomania and French DJ Fred Falke. The album peaked at number one in Switzerland and number two in Germany – it was certified gold by the Swiss branch of the International Federation of the Phonographic Industry and the Bundesverband Musikindustrie in Germany. The album produced three singles: "Perfect World", "Move in the Right Direction" and "Get a Job", with "Move in the Right Direction" reaching number three in Austria and number 11 in Germany.

Albums

Studio albums

Live albums

Remix albums

Extended plays

Singles

Promotional singles

Other appearances
These songs have not appeared on a studio album released by Gossip.

Music videos

References

Discographies of American artists
Rock music group discographies